Klatten is a surname. Notable people with the surname include: 

Joanna Klatten (born 1985), French golfer
Susanne Klatten (born 1962), German billionaire heiress